Butterflies in the stomach is the physical sensation in humans of a "fluttery" feeling in the stomach, caused by a reduction of blood flow to the organ. This is as a result of the release of adrenaline in the fight-or-flight response, which causes increased heart rate and blood pressure, consequently sending more blood to the muscles.

Butterflies in the stomach are usually linked in culture and language to the sentiment of love and sexual/romantic passion to a desired other. One may feel butterflies in the stomach prior to meeting or confronting a love interest due to high levels of emotion and anxiety, as adrenaline and serotonin may be released when a love interest is concerned.

It can also be a symptom of social anxiety disorder. The symptom of this phenomenon is usually experienced prior to attempting to partake in something critical.

See also
Anxiety

References

Emotion
Metaphors referring to body parts